Ladronzuela is a Mexican telenovela produced by Miguel Ángel Herrera for Televisa in 1978.

Cast 
Macaria as Perlita
Juan Ferrara as Miguel Angel
Rocio Banquells as Gilda
Salvador Pineda as Gabriel
Beatriz Aguirre
Lili Inclán
Patricia Meyer
Dina de Marco
Alfredo Wally Barrón
Luis Miranda
Rosa Furman
Cristina Moreno
Wally Barrón
Alma Delfina

References

External links 

Mexican telenovelas
1978 telenovelas
Televisa telenovelas
Spanish-language telenovelas
1978 Mexican television series debuts
1978 Mexican television series endings